Aleksandr Igorevich Logunov (born 22 June 1996) is a Russian football player.

Club career
He made his debut in the Russian Football National League for FC Baltika Kaliningrad on 25 October 2015 in a game against FC Tom Tomsk.

References

External links
 Profile by Russian Football National League
 
 

1996 births
People from Dimitrovgrad, Russia
Living people
Russian footballers
Association football defenders
Russian expatriate footballers
Expatriate footballers in Belarus
FC Rostov players
FC Baltika Kaliningrad players
FC Lokomotiv Moscow players
FC Lada-Tolyatti players
FC Luch Minsk (2012) players
FC Avangard Kursk players
FC Zenit-Izhevsk players
FC Mashuk-KMV Pyatigorsk players
Sportspeople from Ulyanovsk Oblast